Gymnastics was contested at the 2006 Asian Games in Doha, Qatar.  Artistic gymnastics took place from December 2 to December 6. Rhythmic gymnastics took place on December 9 and 10, while Trampoline was contested on December 11 and 12. All Gymnastics events took place at Aspire Hall 2.

Schedule

Medalists

Men's artistic

Women's artistic

Rhythmic

Trampoline

Medal table

Participating nations
A total of 167 athletes from 23 nations competed in gymnastics at the 2006 Asian Games:

References
 Results

External links
 
 
 

 
2006
2006 Asian Games events
Asian Games